The Beagles is a Saturday morning animated television series that aired on CBS from September 10, 1966, to September 2, 1967. The show was produced by Total Television, which created King Leonardo and His Short Subjects, Tennessee Tuxedo and His Tales, and Underdog. The show was cancelled by CBS after one season, despite finishing in the top 10 for Saturday mornings. It then went into reruns on ABC from September 9, 1967, to September 2, 1968. It was also the last animated series produced by Total Television before it went defunct in 1969.

Inspiration
It is widely assumed that the show drew inspiration from the rock band the Beatles, based on the similarity of the show's name.  The two characters in the band, Stringer and Tubby, were spoofs of Dean Martin and Jerry Lewis.  However, the music they played bore no resemblance to anything Martin & Lewis performed, and was clearly derived from the popular music coming out of Britain at the time, as was the show's title.  In 1966, small children watching cartoons on TV were unlikely to remember Martin & Lewis, who broke up ten years earlier.  

The original masters of this series are in the possession of TTV artist Joe Harris, according to
an interview Harris did for the book Created and Produced by Total Television Productions by
Mark Arnold.

A soundtrack album, Here Come the Beagles, was released on Columbia Records's Harmony offshoot in 1967. The single "Looking For The Beagles/I Want To Capture You" was released on Columbia, as Harmony did not release singles.

Bio
The Beagles were different from The Beatles in that The Beagles were a duo rather than a quartet and both members were anthropomorphic dogs. Stringer (voiced by Sandy Becker impersonating Dean Martin), the tall one, played guitar, while Tubby (voiced by Allen Swift impersonating Jerry Lewis), short, fat and wearing spectacles, played stand-up bass. They often got into trouble as a result of publicity stunts planned by their manager, a Scottish terrier named Scotty (also voiced by Swift).

Segments

Episodes

Cancellation
According to Joe Harris, the editor of The Beagles died on the job and his widow threw out all the editing materials including the master negatives. The series was presumed lost; but the original negatives and tracks were found decades later in a warehouse owned by Golden Books. The films had apparently been shipped by mistake to Producers Associates of Television, General Mills' TV film subsidiary, which owned all of Total Television's other series, and were only discovered after Golden Books had bought P. A.T.'s interests.

References

External links
 Cast listing of first episode
 Production notes on first episode
 

1960s American animated television series
1960s American musical comedy television series
1966 American television series debuts
1967 American television series endings
American Broadcasting Company original programming
American children's animated comedy television series
American children's animated musical television series
Animated musical groups
Animated television series about dogs
English-language television shows
CBS original programming
Television series by Universal Television
Total Television